Lobed cactus coral may refer to two similar species of coral:

 Lobophyllia corymbosa
 Lobophyllia hemprichii

Lobophylliidae
Set index articles on corals